Huelskamp is a surname. Notable people with the name include:
Emily Huelskamp (born 1987), American rower
Tim Huelskamp (born 1968), American politician

German-language surnames